Keith County is a county in the U.S. state of Nebraska. As of the 2010 United States Census, the population was 8,368. Its county seat is Ogallala.

In the Nebraska license plate system, Keith County is represented by the prefix 68 (it had the sixty-eighth-largest number of vehicles registered in the county when the license plate system was established in 1922).

History
Keith County was formed in 1873. Sources differ on the Keith after whom it was named: either M. C. Keith of North Platte, whose grandson Keith Neville became Nebraska's 18th governor in 1917; or John Keith, also of North Platte.

Geography
The terrain of Keith County consists of low rolling hills. The level areas are used for agriculture, mainly in the lower part of the county. The North Platte River flows eastward into the northwest end of the county, feeding Lake McConaughy, then exiting the county's east line near its midpoint. The South Platte River flows eastward into the southwest end of the county, and crosses the lower central part of the county before exiting to the east, headed for its junction with the North Platte River well to the east of Keith County.

Most of Nebraska's 93 counties (the eastern 2/3) observe Central Time; the western counties observe Mountain Time. Keith County is the easternmost of the Nebraska counties to observe Mountain Time.

Major highways

  Interstate 80
  U.S. Highway 26
  U.S. Highway 30
  Nebraska Highway 61
  Nebraska Highway 92

Adjacent counties

 Arthur County – north
 McPherson County – northeast (boundary of Central Time)
 Lincoln County – east (boundary of Central Time)
 Perkins County – south
 Deuel County – west
 Garden County – northwest

Protected areas
 Clear Creek State Waterfowl Management Area (partial)
 Lake McConaughy State Recreation Area

Demographics

As of the census of 2000, there were 8,875 people, 3,707 households, and 2,535 families residing in the county.  The population density was 8 people per square mile (3/km2).  There were 5,178 housing units at an average density of 5 per square mile (2/km2).  The racial makeup of the county was 96.75% White, 0.08% Black or African American, 0.71% Native American, 0.17% Asian, 1.49% from other races, and 0.80% from two or more races.  4.23% of the population were Hispanic or Latino of any race.

There were 3,707 households, out of which 30.20% had children under the age of 18 living with them, 58.60% were married couples living together, 7.00% had a female householder with no husband present, and 31.60% were non-families. 27.90% of all households were made up of individuals, and 13.50% had someone living alone who was 65 years of age or older.  The average household size was 2.37 and the average family size was 2.89.

In the county, the population was spread out, with 25.30% under the age of 18, 5.70% from 18 to 24, 25.30% from 25 to 44, 25.40% from 45 to 64, and 18.40% who were 65 years of age or older.  The median age was 41 years. For every 100 females there were 96.50 males.  For every 100 females age 18 and over, there were 92.80 males.

The median income for a household in the county was $32,325, and the median income for a family was $39,118. Males had a median income of $26,523 versus $19,024 for females. The per capita income for the county was $17,421.  About 6.60% of families and 9.30% of the population were below the poverty line, including 13.10% of those under age 18 and 8.20% of those age 65 or over.

Communities

City
 Ogallala (county seat)

Villages
 Brule
 Paxton

Census-designated places
 Belmar
 Keystone
 Lemoyne
 Martin
 Roscoe
 Sarben

Unincorporated communities
 Nevens
 Ruthton

Former communities
 Alkali 
 Bertha
 Conditville
 Eckeryvill
 Korty
 Megeath
 Oren
 Pickard
 Plano

Politics

See also
 National Register of Historic Places listings in Keith County, Nebraska

References

Further reading
 John Janovy Jr. "Keith County Journal" St. Martin's Press (1978)
 John Janovy Jr. "Yellowlegs: A Migration of the Mind" Houghton Mifflin Company (1980)
 John Janovy Jr. "Back in Keith County" University of Nebraska Press (1982)

 
Nebraska counties
1873 establishments in Nebraska
Populated places established in 1873